Joshua Elekwachi Kalu (born August 28, 1995) is an American football strong safety for the Tennessee Titans of the National Football League (NFL). He was signed by the Tennessee Titans as an undrafted free agent in 2018. He played college football at Nebraska.

Early years
Born in 1995, Kalu was a native of Houston. He attended Alief Taylor High School in Alief, Texas, where he played football at the safety position.

College career
Kalu played as a defensive back for the Nebraska Cornhuskers football team for four years from 2014 to 2017. He appeared in a total of 46 games for Nebraska, missing only three games as a senior due to injury. He compiled seven interceptions and 215 tackles. In 2017, Nebraska's coaching staff moved him from the cornerback to the safety position. During his recruitment and playing career with Nebraska, he had six separate position coaches due to repeated staff turnover.

College statistics

Professional career

Tennessee Titans

2018 season
On May 11, 2018, the Tennessee Titans signed Kalu as an undrafted free agent. On August 12, 2018, Kalu was released by the Titans, but was re-signed eight days later. He was waived on September 1, 2018 and was signed to the practice squad the next day. He was promoted to the active roster on December 1, 2018. Kalu mainly played on special teams and finished the season with 4 tackles.

2019 season

On September 2, 2019, Kalu was placed on injured reserve. He was designated for return from injured reserve on October 30, 2019, and began practicing with the team again. He was added to the 53-man roster on November 2, 2019.  On November 10, 2019, in Week 10, Kalu blocked a game-tying field goal against the Kansas City Chiefs in a 35-32 upset victory.  Kalu finished the 2019 regular season with six tackles and one pass defense.

2020 season
Kalu finished the 2020 regular season with a career-high 16 tackles.

New York Giants 
On March 30, 2021, Kalu signed a contract with the New York Giants. In his first preseason game with the Giants, Kalu suffered a torn pectoral muscle and was placed on season-ending injured reserve.

Tennessee Titans (second stint)
On July 23, 2022, Kalu signed with the Tennessee Titans.

NFL career statistics

Regular season

Postseason

References

External links
 Tennessee Titans bio

1995 births
Living people
American football cornerbacks
Nebraska Cornhuskers football players
Tennessee Titans players
Players of American football from Houston
American football safeties
New York Giants players